This is a list of mountains in Cabo Verde:

List

See also
Lists of mountains by region
Geography of Cape Verde

Notes

External links

Cape Verde
Mountains
Cape